The Ritual Decalogue is a list of laws at . These laws are similar to the Covenant Code and are followed by the phrase "ten commandments" (in ).

Critical biblical scholars understand the two sets of laws to have different authorship.
Believing that the Bible reflected a shift over time from an emphasis on the ritual to the ethical, they argued that the Ritual Decalogue was composed earlier than the Ethical Decalogue.
Later scholars have held that they were actually parallel developments, with the Ethical Decalogue a late addition to Exodus copied from Deuteronomy, or that the Ritual Decalogue was the later of the two, a conservative reaction to the secular Ethical Decalogue.
A few Bible scholars call the verses in Exodus 34 the "small Covenant code", as it appears to be a compact version of the Covenant Code in Exodus –; they argue the small Covenant code was composed around the same time as the Decalogue of Exodus 20, but either served different functions within Israelite religion, or reflects the influence of other Ancient Near Eastern religious texts.

The word decalogue comes from the Greek name for the Ten Commandments,  ("ten terms"), a translation of the Hebrew  ( "the ten items/terms").

Biblical context
The Ritual Decalogue is framed in the context of God making a covenant with Israel:

Yahweh said to Moses, Cut two tablets of stone like the former ones, and I will write on the tablets the words that were on the former tablets, which you broke. ... I hereby make a covenant.
 [Commandments of Exodus 34]
 Yahweh said to Moses, Write these words; in accordance with these words I have made a covenant with you and with Israel. ... And he wrote on the tablets the words of the covenant, the ten commandments [ ].

Assuming that Moses is being commanded to write down the content of verses 15-26 on the new tablets, this would be the only place in the Bible where the phrase Ten Commandments identifies an explicit set of commandments.

Interpretations
While Orthodox Judaism and Christianity hold that both sets contained the same ten commandments, some scholars identify verses 11-26 as an alternate "ten commandments" which they call the "ritual" decalogue. For these scholars, the terms "ritual decalogue" and "ethical decalogue" are a way of distinguishing between alternate inscriptions of the ten commandments.

The commandments in the Ritual Decalogue are expanded upon in the Covenant Code, which occurs prior to it in the Torah, and thus have the impression of being a summary of the important points in the Code. The Covenant Code is believed by most scholars of biblical criticism as having originally been a separate text to the Torah, and thus there is much debate as to the relationship between the Ritual Decalogue and Covenant Code.  There are essentially two positions, neither of which is decisively supported, either by evidence, or by number of scholars:

 Either the commandments of the Ritual Decalogue were originally indistinct commandments in the body of a much larger work, such as the Covenant Code, and were selected as being the most important by some process, whether gradual filtering or by an individual,
 Or the Covenant Code represents a later expansion of the Ritual Decalogue, with additional commandments added on, again either by gradual aggregation, or by an individual.

The documentary hypothesis identifies the Ritual Decalogue as the work of the Jahwist, from the Kingdom of Judah, and the Covenant Code as that of the Elohist, from the Kingdom of Israel, both writing independently. It does not however answer the question of how these texts were related, merely that the Ritual Decalogue circulated in Judah, and the Covenant Code in Israel. What the documentary hypothesis does partly explain is the relationship of the Ritual Decalogue to the Ethical Decalogue, and why, instead of the Ethical Decalogue, it is the Ritual Decalogue which is written on the two tablets when Moses ascends the mountain to have the Ethical Decalogue inscribed for a second time.

The documentary hypothesis claims that the Jahwist and Elohist texts were first combined by a redactor, producing a text referred to simply as JE, in such a way that it now reads that God dictated the Covenant Code, which was written onto stone, Moses subsequently smashing these stones at the incident of the golden calf, and thus having to go back and get a new set, with a set of commandments, the Ritual Decalogue, resembling the first. Under this reconstruction another writer, the Priestly source, later took offence at parts of JE, and rewrote it, dropping the story of the golden calf, and replacing the Ritual Decalogue with a new (ethical) decalogue initially based on it, but taking commandments from elsewhere as well, and replacing the Covenant Code with a vast new law code, placed after the Decalogue for narrative reasons, most of which forms the greater part of the mitzvot in Leviticus.

The reconstruction then suggests that a century later yet another writer, the Deuteronomist, objected to the Priestly source, and rewrote it yet again, but in a different style:  that of a series of flashbacks, producing a second slightly different copy of the Ethical Decalogue, and re-introducing the golden calf. Presented with such divergent versions of the same event, a later redactor is thought to have combined all three versions – JE, the Priestly source, and Deuteronomist, together. JE and the Priestly source were interleaved together, altering JE so that it was now the Ethical Decalogue which was written on the first set of tablets and subsequently destroyed. The alteration, by careful juxtaposition, subtly implied that the second set of tablets also received the Ethical rather than Ritual Decalogue, despite the text saying, immediately after the Ritual Decalogue,
 The  said to Moses, Write these words; in accordance with these words I have made a covenant with you and with Israel. [...] And he wrote on the tablets the words of the covenant, the ten commandments [emphasis added]

Decalogues compared

Covenant codes compared
These have been differentiated as the "Small Covenant Code" (Exodus 34) and the "Large Covenant Code" (Exodus 20–23). These views are not mutually exclusive. Aaron (2006), for example, discusses how the "Exodus 34 Decalogue", while presented as the Ten Commandments, appears to be a reworking of the Covenant Code. Indeed, H.L. Ginsberg believed that the Ritual Decalogue was an interpolation, and that the phrase "Ten Commandments" in Exodus 34:28 originally referred to a portion of the Covenant Code, which he called the First Ritual Decalogue.

References

Bibliography

Further reading

External links
The Ritual Decalogue versus the Ethical Decalogue, BBC h2g2

Biblical criticism
Biblical law
Documentary hypothesis
Jewish law and rituals
Ten Commandments
Religious terminology